Dave Cochrane is an English bass guitarist that played in noise rock band Head of David along Justin Broadrick. He has also collaborated with Justin Broadrick and Kevin Martin on several occasions.

He now plays in the industrial psychedelic band Terminal Cheescake and the noise metal outfit Bruxa Maria

Biography
Dave Cochrane joined the noise rock group Head of David after having played with Mick Harris in the punk band Anorexia. After leavingHead Of David in 1989, he formed Sweet Tooth with former Slab! drummer Scott Kiehl. Justin Broadrick joined them on guitar and the trio recorded one EP for Earache Records before disbanding. He has collaborated with British musician Kevin Martin and played and recorded with God and Ice, Techno Animal and Jesu.
He now plays in the noise metal outfit Bruxa Maria and Terminal Cheesecake

Discography

References
General

 
 

Notes

Living people
English bass guitarists
English male guitarists
Male bass guitarists
God (British band) members
Ice (band) members
British rock bass guitarists
Year of birth missing (living people)